Barre or Barré may refer to:

 Barre (name) or Barré, a surname and given name

Places

United States
 Barre, Massachusetts, a New England town
 Barre (CDP), Massachusetts, the central village in the town
 Barre, New York, a town
 Barre (city), Vermont
 Barre (town), Vermont
 Barre, Wisconsin, a town
 Port Barre, Louisiana, a town

Other countries
 Barre, Tarn, France
 Barré Glacier, Antarctica
 Mount Barre, Antarctica

Other uses
 Barré (automobile) (1899–1930), French automobile manufacturer established by Gaston Barré

 Barre (ballet), a handrail used in ballet exercises
 Barre (brewery), a German beer brewer
 Barre (exercise), a form of physical exercise that uses the ballet barre and ballet-inspired movements and positions
 Barré (fabric), a defect in fabrics
 Barre chord, a type of guitar chord
 Barre Granite, a variety of Vermont granite
 Barré Studio, an early film studio dedicated to animation

 Purple drank, a recreational drug beverage also known as barre

See also
 La Barre (disambiguation)
 Barre-des-Cévennes, Lozère département, France
 Guillain–Barré syndrome, an autoimmune disorder affecting the peripheral nervous system
 Wilkes-Barre, Pennsylvania, USA
 Barr (disambiguation)
 Barrie (disambiguation)